The Matyó are a subgroup of Hungarians. The Matyó people populate an ethnographic region in Northern Hungary, called "Matyó Land (Matyóföld)". Matyó Land consists of the town of  Mezőkövesd and its vicinity. The Matyó have retained distinctive traditions, costumes and embroidery.

Origin
Traditionally, the Matyó and Palóc populations were considered to share common ancestors but recent researches question this shared origin.

References

Ethnic groups in Hungary